Alynna Alexandra Asistio (born September 27, 1991 in Caloocan, Philippines) is a Filipina actress. She was a contract artist of GMA Network and moved to ABS-CBN in August 2013. She is known for her roles in the GMA network's shows like the telefantasya Mga Mata ni Anghelita, Who's Your Daddy Now? and La Vendetta. She appeared on ABS-CBN's game show Minute-to-Win-It. She also appeared on the weekend drama anthology Maalaala Mo Kaya.

Personal life
She is the daughter of actress Nadia Montenegro and former Caloocan Mayor, Macario "Boy" Asistio, Jr. and the niece of Hazel Ann Mendoza. Asistio has dated high-profile Philippine actors such as Mark Herras and Derek Ramsay. Asistio is of Spanish descent on her mother's side. Asistio lives in Ayala Heights in Quezon City.

Filmography

Television

Films

References

External links
 Alynna Asistio at iGMA.tv
 

1991 births
Living people
Actresses from Metro Manila
Filipino child actresses
Filipino film actresses
Filipino people of Spanish descent
People from Caloocan
GMA Network personalities
ABS-CBN personalities
Star Magic personalities
Viva Artists Agency